Yalpana Vaipava Malai is a book written by a Tamil poet named Mayil Vaakaanar in 1736.  This book contains historical facts of the early Tamil city of Jaffna.  The book which may have been written around 1736 during the Governorship of Jan Maccara, the then Dutch Governor of Jaffna.  It was translated from Tamil by C. Brito, and was first published in 1879.  The work is looked upon as one of great authority among the Tamils of Jaffna.

Sources 

The author says that he referred to the books Kailaya Malai, Vaiyai Padal and Pararajasekaran Ula for his work. It is said that these books are composed not earlier than the fourteenth century, contain folklore, legends and myths mixed with historical anecdotes. Today, except the Kailaya Malai which has been printed, and a few manuscript copies of Vaiya Padal, the other works are very rare and hardly procurable. The only manuscript of Yalpana Vaipava Malai itself was destroyed by the United National Party in May 1981 during the burning of the Jaffna library.

Contents
It starts with the King Vibeeshana who ruled Sri Lanka after the Rama- Ravana war according to the Hindu epic Ramayana. Then it refers the Mahawamsa and discusses the Bengali Prince Vijaya and his brother's son Panduvasan, the rulers from north India. Chronicles such as the Yalpana Vaipava Malai and stone inscriptions like Konesar Kalvettu recount that Kulakkottan, an early Chola king and descendant of Manu Needhi Cholan, who was the restorer of the ruined Koneswaram temple and tank at Trincomalee in 438, the Munneswaram temple of the west coast, and as the royal who settled ancient Vanniyars in the east of the island Eelam.

According to Yalpana Vaipava Malai the history of Jaffna starts with a blind musician called Panan or Yalpadi. He received a land called Manatri from the ruler of Sri Lanka. Manatri was renamed as Yalpanam by Panan. Then it comes with the Koolangai Chakravarti who was the ruler of Jaffna after Panan. It further elaborates upon the Formation of Nallur, arrival of Tamils, and other kings of Jaffna. During the eighth century Ugrasinghan, a prince of the dynasty of the legendary Vijaya, coming with an army from India, descended upon Sri Lanka and captured one half of the island. He established his capital first at Katiramalai, known now as Kantarodai, and then shifted it to Singhai Nagar, a town on the eastern coast of the Jaffna Peninsula. Though the story of Ugrasinghan has generally been rejected by scholars, some are of the view that this story is "based on a historical fact", namely that Ugrasinghan has been confused with Manavamma who was helped by the Pallava King Narasinghavarman. After stating some facts about the Portuguese rule of Ceylon, the book ends with some facts of the Dutch rule.

References

Jaffna Peninsula

External links
 Project Noolaham ebook details

Jaffna kingdom
1736 books
Sri Lankan Tamil literature